The Welsh Rugby Union Division Five South West (also called the SWALEC Division Five South West for sponsorship reasons) is a rugby union league in Wales first implemented for the 1995/96 season.

Competition format and sponsorship

Competition
There are 11 clubs in the WRU Division Five South West. During the course of a season (which lasts from September to May) each club plays the others twice, once at their home ground and once at that of their opponents for a total of 20 games for each club, with a total of 110 games in each season. Teams receive four points for a win and two point for a draw, an additional bonus point is awarded to either team if they score four tries or more in a single match. No points are awarded for a loss though the losing team can gain a bonus point for finishing the match within seven points of the winning team. Teams are ranked by total points, then the number of tries scored and then points difference. At the end of each season, the club with the most points is crowned as champion. If points are equal the tries scored then points difference determines the winner. The team who is declared champion at the end of the season is eligible for promotion to the WRU Division Four South. The two lowest placed teams are relegated into the WRU Division Six Central.

Sponsorship 
In 2008 the Welsh Rugby Union announced a new sponsorship deal for the club rugby leagues with SWALEC valued at £1 million (GBP). The initial three year sponsorship was extended at the end of the 2010/11 season, making SWALEC the league sponsors until 2015. The leagues sponsored are the WRU Divisions one through to seven.

 (2002-2005) Lloyds TSB
 (2005-2008) Asda
 (2008-2015) SWALEC

2010/2011 Season

League teams
 Alltwen RFC
 Baglan RFC
 Crynant RFC
 Cwmgors RFC
 Cwmtwrch RFC
 Glais RFC
 Gowerton RFC
 Neath Athletic RFC
 New Dock Stars RFC
 Penlan RFC
 Trebanos RFC
 Tycroes RFC

2009/2010 Season

League teams
 Alltwen RFC
 Birchgrove RFC
 Crynant RFC
 Cwmgors RFC
 Cwmtwrch RFC
 Glais RFC
 Gowerton RFC
 Llandybie RFC
 Neath Athletic RFC
 Penlan RFC
 Tycroes RFC
 Trebanos RFC

League table

2008/2009 Season

League teams
 Abercrave RFC
 Alltwen RFC
 Cwmtwrch RFC
 Glais RFC
 Gowerton RFC
 Llandybie RFC
 New Dock Stars RFC
 Penygroes RFC
 Pontardawe RFC
 Swansea Uplands RFC
 Trebanos RFC

2007/2008 Season

League teams
 Alltwen RFC
 Betws RFC
 Bynea RFC
 Cwmtwrch RFC
 Glais RFC
 Gowerton RFC
 New Dock Stars RFC
 Pontardawe RFC
 Swansea Uplands RFC
 Trebanos RFC
 Ystradgynlais RFC

League table

References

7